Yisrael Galili (10 February 1911 – 8 February 1986) was an Israeli politician, government minister and member of Knesset. Before Israel's independence in 1948, he served as Chief of Staff of the Haganah.

Biography
Yisrael Berchenko (later Galili) was born in the town of Brailiv in the Russian Empire (now Ukraine). His family immigrated to Palestine when he was three years old and settled in Tel Aviv. Galili attended school there and apprenticed with a printer.

Galili was a founder of the HaNoar HaOved ("Working Youth") youth group, and of Na'an, a kibbutz where he lived until his death.

Military career
Galili began his military career in 1927, when he enlisted in the Haganah. He was appointed to the organization's leadership committee in 1935, and was later placed in charge of Acquisitions and Armaments. During the Second World War, he was involved in preparations to counter an anticipated German invasion of Palestine. He was appointed Chief of Staff of the Haganah in 1946, and served in that capacity until June 1948 when he was removed by David Ben-Gurion  in what was called the "Generals' Revolt".

Political career
He served in the first Knesset from 1949 to 1951, and then again from 1955 until 1977, first on behalf of the Mapam party, before being part of the split that formed Ahdut HaAvoda and later merged into the Alignment. He served briefly as Minister of Information and was Minister without Portfolio in several governments. One of Prime Minister Golda Meir's top advisers, and member of her Cabinet, he was also a member of the prestigious Foreign Affairs and Defense Committee and on the Ministerial Committee for Settlement.

Victor John Ostrovsky, a self-proclaimed former katsa (case officer) for the Israeli Mossad (foreign intelligence service) claimed in his book  By Way of Deception that Galili had a lengthy affair with Golda Meir (Prime Minister of Israel) who was some 13 years his senior.

References

External links

1911 births
1986 deaths
Ahdut HaAvoda politicians
Alignment (Israel) politicians
Government ministers of Israel
Haganah members
Israeli Labor Party politicians
Israeli military personnel
Jewish National Council members
Jewish socialists
Mapam politicians
Members of the 1st Knesset (1949–1951)
Members of the 3rd Knesset (1955–1959)
Members of the 4th Knesset (1959–1961)
Members of the 5th Knesset (1961–1965)
Members of the 6th Knesset (1965–1969)
Members of the 7th Knesset (1969–1974)
Members of the 8th Knesset (1974–1977)
Jews from the Russian Empire
Emigrants from the Russian Empire to the Ottoman Empire